Undercover Angel, also known as  Un vrai petit ange (French title in Canada), is a 1999 romantic comedy film written and directed by Bryan Michael Stoller and starring Yasmine Bleeth and Dean Winters.

Plot
The story begins with a mystery-suspense script that is being written by a man, Harrison (Dean Winters) who is a struggling freelance author of up-and-coming pulp novels. During the middle of Harrison’s day that was going uneasy for him, he becomes the unwilling babysitter of a charming, charismatic, and precocious little six-year-old girl, Jenny (Emily Mae Young), when her mother, Melissa (Lorraine Ansell), one of Harrison's former lovers whom he hasn't seen for several years, asks him to babysit because she needs to be out of town for several weeks.

Harrison is originally unenthusiastic about the arrangement, but soon he develops a tenderness for Jenny after spending time to get to know her.  Little Jenny decides to play matchmaker for Harrison and Holly (Yasmine Bleeth), a beautiful woman he admires who frequently visits the same coffee shop as Harrison and Jenny.

Harrison tells stories for Jenny about Mr. Dodo—her favorite stuffed animal.  Jenny secretly records them and gets Holly to transcribe the books, and they submit them to his publisher.  Harrison accidentally discovers that he is Jenny's father. Jenny's mother returns early and takes her away. Harrison tries to find a job in order to have financial stability and eligible for custody of Jenny.  Harrison tries to get custody of Jenny instead of her uncaring mother. The publisher contacts and contracts him for the Mr. Dodo series, which becomes a publishing success. Despite this, the judge (James Earl Jones) grants custody to Melissa. However, Melissa later realizes that she was wrong and returns Jenny to Harrison.

Cast

Production
 Most of the film was shot on location in Ottawa, Ontario, Canada in July and August 1998.  Some of the locations were the Canal Ritz Restaurant, Thunderbird Mini-golf and Go-Karts, The Supreme Court of Canada, and the Chapters location at the Pinecrest Shopping Centre. The scenes featuring Casey Kasem were filmed in a studio at CTV Ottawa.
 A scene was scheduled to be filmed with Jim Varney but was cancelled due to Yasmine Bleeth's agent refusing to allow her to be in a movie with him.  Ultimately his part was played by a local actor in Ottawa as head of the go-kart track.
 Jay Leno was in talks to play the talk show host, but Casey Kasem ended up filling the role.
 The Ottawa Citizen had an ad to find extras for the film.  Anyone interested was asked to write a short letter and fax it in.  From those, extras were chosen for filming throughout the film.
 Glen Kulka, former football player and wrestler, moonlighted as security on the set.
 A film premiere was held at the Coliseum Theatres on Carling Avenue the year after filming.  Bryan Michael Stoller and Emily Mae Young were in attendance.

External links
 
 Computer graphic of Mr. Dodo as used in Miss Cast Away, an otherwise unrelated film from the same writer/director.

1999 films
1999 romantic comedy films
Canadian romantic comedy films
English-language Canadian films
Films shot in Ottawa
American romantic comedy films
1990s English-language films
1990s American films
1990s Canadian films